Hieronymus Gerhard Maria "Jérôme" Reehuis (7 July 1939 – 17 May 2013) was a Dutch actor and poet. 

Reehuis was born in Apeldoorn.  He became known for his distinctive, warm voice and exemplary diction. He became known to the general public for his role in the film The Bossom Friend.

Reehuis died in Amsterdam, aged 73.

Filmography

External links

References

1939 births
2013 deaths
20th-century Dutch male actors
Dutch male film actors
Dutch male television actors
People from Apeldoorn